Lachesilla floridana is a species of fateful barklouse in the family Lachesillidae. It is found in North America.

References

Further reading

 
 
 

Lachesillidae
Insects described in 1999